Hero of the Times is a Singaporean-Taiwanese wuxia television series based on legends about Fong Sai-yuk (Mandarin: Fang Shiyu), a Chinese folk hero and martial artist who lived during the Qing dynasty. It was co-produced by the Television Corporation of Singapore and Taiwan's China Television, directed by Hu Mingkai, and starred Chinese actor Vincent Zhao as Fang Shiyu. It was first aired in Singapore on TCS Eighth Frequency (now MediaCorp Channel 8) from late 1999 to early 2000.

Plot
The series is set in China during the reign of the Yongzheng Emperor of the Manchu-led Qing dynasty. The emperor orders Nalan Degang, a Manchu bannerman, to form and lead a secret death squad to eliminate the Great Ming Society, a Yangzhou-based underground movement seeking to overthrow the Qing dynasty and restore the Ming dynasty. The death squad is named "Flying Guillotines" after the highly dreaded weapon used by its members.

Fang Shiyu is the elder son of Fang De, the governor of Yangzhou. He spends his time enjoying life with his best friend, Nalan Dekai, who is Nalan Degang's younger brother. Zhu Lingce, the Black Guardian of the Great Ming Society, is a descendant of the imperial clan of the Ming dynasty. In the past, he had a romantic affair with Miao Cuihua, Fang Shiyu's mother, but chose to give up on her to pursue his quest to overthrow the Qing dynasty. Although Miao Cuihua married Fang De and bore him two sons, she still has romantic feelings for Zhu Lingce. It turns out later that Fang De is actually the White Guardian of the Great Ming Society and he has been secretly using his position as the governor of Yangzhou to help the society in their anti-Qing activities.

Fang Shiyu and Nalan Dekai travel to Shaolin Monastery to learn martial arts and master the Yijin Jing. Their friend, Song Tiezhu, succumbs to the temptation of glory and chooses to join Nalan Degang and serve the Qing government as a spy. When Nalan Degang captures Zhu Lingce, Fang Shiyu and his friends break into prison to save him. However, Song Tiezhu betrays them, causes Zhu Lingce to get killed, and exposes Fang De's true identity as the White Guardian of the Great Ming Society. While Fang De is arrested and taken to Beijing, Fang Shiyu manages to escape and he brings along Nalan Dekai, who was injured while helping him, to Shaolin Monastery for treatment. However, Song Tiezhu leads Qing forces to attack Shaolin and capture them. Fang Shiyu defeats Song Tiezhu in a fight and permanently disables him to prevent him from harming others again.

The Yongzheng Emperor uses a scheme to create a misunderstanding between Fang De and the Great Ming Society and tricks the society into believing that Fang De betrayed them. Fang De has no choice but to commit suicide to prove his innocence. In the meantime, Fang Shiyu trains hard in martial arts with the aim of seeking justice and avenging his father. He breaks into the Forbidden City and tries to assassinate the Yongzheng Emperor, but ultimately gives up on his quest for vengeance when he realises the best option is to spare the emperor's life because there will be further chaos and bloodshed if a power vacuum is created when the emperor dies.

Cast

 Vincent Zhao as Fang Shiyu
 Leanne Liu as Miao Cuihua
 Vincent Ng as Nalan Dekai
 Yvonne Lim as Lei Xiaoti
 Ix Shen as Nalan Degang
 May Phua as Princess Fulu
 Chunyu Shanshan as Song Tiezhu
 Shirley He as You Hongxiu
 Rayson Tan as Zhu Lingce
 Li Wenhai as Fang De
 Cai Yiwei as Fang Shaoyu
 Wang Huichun as the Yongzheng Emperor
 Huang Chung-kun as the Fourteenth Prince
 Chen Guohua as Murong Yixiao
 Xiang Yun as Wu Hua'niang
 Lin Meijiao as Abbess Babao
 Elvis Tsui as Ao Tianwei
 Qian Zhigang as Lei Laohu
 Wang Ailing as Xiantao
 Lau Shun as the Kangxi Emperor
 Chen Wencong as Zhu Qifeng
 Dai Peng as Xie Junyuan
 Zhou Quanxi as Princess Fulu's father
 Chen Zhiguang as Yaoba
 Fan Wenjie as Jinbo
 He Saizhou as Yinhuan
 Wang Xiuyun as Zhima Dama
 Hong Zhaorong as Du Liaoliao
 Liang Tian as Wuliuye
 Zheng Wen as Feng Haichao
 Yang Tianfu as Jiang Changzhi
 Li Zhizhou as Sima Jin

See also
 Fong Sai-yuk, the main character in the television series.
 Fong Sai-yuk (film), a 1993 Hong Kong film starring Jet Li as Fong Sai-yuk.
 Fong Sai-yuk II, a sequel to Fong Sai-yuk (1993).

External links
 Hero of the Times on MediaCorp's website

1999 Singaporean television series debuts
2000 Singaporean television series endings
1990s Singaporean television series
2000s Singaporean television series
Singaporean wuxia television series
Taiwanese wuxia television series
Channel 8 (Singapore) original programming